Carlie Hanson (born May 18, 2000) is an American singer-songwriter. In 2018, she released the song "Only One", which garnered attention after being featured on a playlist curated by Taylor Swift. She released her debut extended play, Junk, in June 2019. This was followed by her 2020 extended play, DestroyDestroyDestroyDestroy. Her debut album, Tough Boy, was released in February 2022.

Early life and education
Hanson was born and raised in Onalaska, Wisconsin. She was inspired to become a singer by Justin Bieber and, at 14, she and a friend began posting cover songs on YouTube, hoping to follow Bieber's path.

Career
In May 2016, while working as a cashier at McDonald's, Hanson entered a local iHeartRadio contest to see Zayn in concert. As her entry, she recorded a video of herself singing "Pillowtalk" by Zayn while sitting in a parked car outside a shopping mall. She posted the video to Instagram, and it was quickly reposted by iHeart, drawing significant attention. Hanson was subsequently contacted by a talent agent who invited her to Toronto to audition and record for producers from House of Wolf. While in Los Angeles, she worked with songwriter Dale Anthoni. In November 2017, Taylor Swift included Hanson's second single, "Only One", on an Apple Music playlist of her favorite songs. Hanson released a video for the song in March 2018, directed by Similar But Different, who assembled an all-female crew for the shoot. In April 2018, "Only One" was averaging 400,000 streams daily.

In September 2018, Hanson began touring with Troye Sivan and Kim Petras on Sivan's Bloom Tour, playing at venues including Radio City Music Hall in New York and the Greek Theater in Los Angeles. In a review of the Minneapolis show, Twin Cities Media wrote: "She's badass, she’s unapologetic, she’s poppy yet gritty, she's effortlessly cool, her music absolutely bangs, and she’s selfmade. Carlie Hanson is a little bit of Lorde, a little of Billie Eilish meets Kiiara, and a lot of something all her own."

In January 2019, Hanson supported Yungblud on a series of shows in Europe. She then signed with Warner Bros. Records in February 2019, and Primary Wave Music in March 2019. On April 26, 2019, Hanson released "Back in My Arms". The song was later announced to be the lead single from her debut extended play, Junk. On May 24, 2019, she released "WYA", the second single from Junk. Later that day, Taylor Swift added another of Hanson's songs, "Back in My Arms", to her Apple Music playlist. The EP, consisting of five songs, was released on June 7, 2019. In September 2019, she embarked on The WYA Tour across Europe and the United Kingdom.

In November 2019, Hanson released the single "Side Effects". This was followed by other singles including "Daze Inn", "Stealing All My Friends", and "Good Enough". In September 2020, she collaborated with Puerto Rican-American rapper Iann Dior on the song "Ego", and subsequently announced her second extended play, DestroyDestroyDestroyDestroy, which was released on October 23, 2020. The EP was followed by Hanson's debut studio album Tough Boy, released on February 18, 2022. On January 28, 2022, she was featured on a song, titled "Fall Out of Love", which was used for the end credits of the 2022 movie Scream.

Personal life 
In 2018, Hanson stated that she does not have a label for her sexuality, but confirmed that she has had relationships with men and women. She has since publicly spoken out about LGBTQ+ rights in the media, including an interview with Subvrt Magazine in 2018 where she voiced her opinion about the importance of LGBTQ+ role models.

Discography

Studio albums

Extended plays

Singles

Music videos 

 † – Official Performance Video.
 ◊ – Official Visualizer.

References

External links
 

2000 births
American child singers
American women singer-songwriters
American LGBT musicians
Living people
People from Onalaska, Wisconsin
Queer musicians
Warner Records artists
21st-century LGBT people
21st-century American women
Singer-songwriters from Wisconsin